Blood on the Sun is a 1945 American war film directed by Frank Lloyd and starring James Cagney and Sylvia Sidney. The film is based on a fictional history behind the Tanaka Memorial document.

The film won the Academy Award for Best Art Direction for a Black & White (Wiard Ihnen, A. Roland Fields) film in 1945.

Plot
In 1929, the existence of the “Tanaka Memorial,” a Japanese plan devised by Baron Giichi Tanaka to conquer the world, is published in the Tokyo Chronicle. The Japanese secret police visit the Chronicle’s headquarters, interrogating editor Nick Condon about the source, which he refuses to disclose. Intrigued at the heavy-handed response to the rumor, Condon assigns Ollie Miller, a Chronicle reporter, to further research the plan.

Some time later, Ollie and his wife Edith make plans to leave Japan on a ship. Believing he discovered the details of the plan, the secret police arrange to have him killed. When Condon goes to his cabin on the ship, he finds Edith strangled, and narrowly misses another woman exiting the cabin; he glimpses a ruby ring on her hand. Later that night, Ollie is shot outside Condon’s house. Before he dies, he gives to Condon a copy of the Tanaka Memorial plan. As the secret police, led by Captain Oshima , arrive, Condon hides the document behind a portrait of Emperor Hirohito. Revering the portrait, Oshima does not search it, but ransacks the rest of his house and subdues him when he resists.

Condon wakes up the next morning in a prison cell. The Japanese police have fabricated a story about him having a drunken party the previous night and fixed his house to hide the damage, and the document is missing. Condon’s search for it is interrupted by a courier inviting him to Baron Tanaka’s home. At Tanaka’s home, the Baron subtly threatens Condon to return the document, and Condon realizes that Tanaka does not have it and someone else took it.

Suspecting that the other party consists of Japanese anti-war liberals interested in sneaking the document out of the country, Condon publicly announces his intention to return to the United States. That evening, he meets Iris Hilliard, a half-Chinese woman. Seeing a ring on her finger, he suspects she was the woman he saw fleeing Edith’s cabin, but the two are attracted to one another. Unbeknownst to him, Iris is a spy for Baron Tanaka, tasked with retrieving the plan.

Disgruntled at being passed over as Condon’s replacement as editor, Cassell, an unscrupulous reporter, inadvertently reveals that Tanaka ordered him to introduce Iris to Condon. Armed with this knowledge, Condon confronts Iris, who confesses that, while she works for Tanaka, she is loyal to Japan’s liberal fraction and, having no fear of the Emperor’s portrait, she herself took the Tanaka Memorial from his house. Condon takes the document and leaves. Eavesdropping on their conversation, the secret police imprison Iris, but she escapes. Disgraced by his failure, Tanaka commits seppuku.

Before Condon leaves for the United States, Iris contacts him, asking to meet on a fishing dock. Evading the secret police tailing him, Condon meets her on the dock. She is accompanied by Prince Tatsugi, a liberal within the Japanese government. Aware that the government will claim the document is a forgery, Tatsugi places his seal on it, legitimizing it. The police arrive and kill Tatsugi; Condon gives the document to Iris, who flees in a fishing boat, and stays behind to delay the policemen.

Defeating Captain Oshima at judo and evading the secret police, Condon arrives outside the embassy. He is shot and incapacitated, but when the Japanese search him, they are unable to find the document. As an American diplomat arrives to help Condon, the head of the secret police asks him to forgive his enemy. Avoiding a proposed handshake Condon replies, “Sure, forgive your enemies – but first, get even!”

Cast

Adaptations
Blood on the Sun was adapted as a radio play on the December 3, 1945 episode of Lux Radio Theater with James Cagney and on the October 16, 1946 episode of Academy Award Theater starring John Garfield.

Production
Los Angeles Policeman Jack Sergel was featured in several magazine stories listing him as a top judo expert.  William Cagney contacted him about teaching his brother James judo for the film.  Sergel adopted the stage name John Halloran to appear as Cagney's opponent in the film.  He later appeared in several of James Cagney's films, including teaching judo to Edmund O'Brien in White Heat,

Copyright and home video status
In 1973, the film entered the public domain in the United States because the owners did not renew its copyright registration in the 28th year after publication. As a result of this, it has been released in many substandard budget editions with inferior video and audio quality, and missing four minutes of footage.

Its original uncut length was 94 minutes, though an original running time of 98 minutes has been much perpetuated with no supporting evidence whatsoever.

As of 2019, there have been very few quality home video editions. It was released on US DVD (2001, Image Entertainment) with a transfer licensed from the Hal Roach Library. The rear sleeve states: "DIGITALLY MASTERED FROM THE ORIGINAL NITRATE CAMERA NEGATIVE. Blood on the Sun has historically suffered by being presented in very poor 16mm and 35mm dupe versions, most of which contained a very serious indigenous jitter. This stunning digital transfer was made from the brilliant original nitrate camera negative, which remains in mint condition after almost six decades." The DVD has a running time of 94 minutes.

In 1993, Republic Pictures had the film computer-colorized using a high quality print.  This was subsequently released on DVD in the US (2003, Artisan Entertainment) and UK (2000, Eureka Entertainment).

In other media
In the television series Cagney & Lacey, the character Christine Cagney has the poster of Blood on the Sun in her apartment
, with the strapline "Cagney's Mightiest" adding to her characterization.

References

External links

 
 
 
 
 
 

1945 films
1940s English-language films
Films directed by Frank Lloyd
Films set in 1929
Films whose art director won the Best Art Direction Academy Award
United Artists films
World War II films made in wartime
World War II spy films
Films about journalists
Films scored by Miklós Rózsa
Films set in Japan
Films set on ships
American black-and-white films
Articles containing video clips
American war drama films
1940s war drama films
1945 drama films
Japan in non-Japanese culture
Films with screenplays by Garrett Fort